Su Buqing, also spelled Su Buchin (September 23, 1902 – March 17, 2003), was a Chinese mathematician, educator and poet. He was the founder of differential geometry in China, and served as president of Fudan University and honorary chairman of the Chinese Mathematical Society.

Biography
Su was born in Pingyang County, Zhejiang Province in 1902, with ancestry from Quanzhou. After attending Zhejiang Wenzhou High School, he graduated from Tohoku Imperial University in Japan in 1927 and received his Ph.D. from the university in 1931.

After returning to China, he first served as a professor and dean at Zhejiang University (he established the Chen-Su School with Chen Jiangong), and later as professor and president of Fudan University. He was honorary chairman of the Chinese Mathematical Society and elected to Academia Sinica and the Chinese Academy of Sciences in 1948 and 1955 respectively. Su Buqing and Hua Luogeng were the most influential figures in mathematical society of modern China.

Praised commonly in mathematical field as the "first geometer in the orient", Su was engaged in research, teaching and education in differential geometry and computational geometry. In his early years, he made excellent contributions to affine differential geometry and projective differential geometry. He obtained extraordinary achievements in general space differential geometry, conjugating net theory in higher-dimensional space and computer aided geometry design.

Asteroid 297161 Subuchin, discovered by astronomers of the PMO NEO Survey Program in 2008, was named in his memory. The official  was published by the Minor Planet Center on 8 November 2019.

References
 

1902 births
2003 deaths
20th-century Chinese mathematicians
Chinese centenarians
Educators from Wenzhou
Mathematicians from Zhejiang
Members of the Chinese Academy of Sciences
Members of Academia Sinica
Men centenarians
Academic staff of the National Taiwan University
People's Republic of China politicians from Zhejiang
Politicians from Wenzhou
Presidents of Fudan University
Scientists from Wenzhou
Tohoku University alumni
Academic staff of Zhejiang University
Vice Chairpersons of the National Committee of the Chinese People's Political Consultative Conference